Robert Ellis Miller (July 18, 1927 – January 27, 2017) was an American film director.

Filmography

 Breaking Point (1963) - TV Series
 Any Wednesday (1966)
 Sweet November (1968)
 The Heart Is a Lonely Hunter (1968)
 The Buttercup Chain (1970)
 Big Truck and Sister Clare (1972)
 The Girl from Petrovka (1974)
 Just an Old Sweet Song (1976)
 Ishi: The Last of His Tribe (1978)
 The Baltimore Bullet (1980)
 Madame X (1981)
 Reuben, Reuben (1983)
 Her Life as a Man (1984)
 The Other Lover (1985)
 Intimate Strangers (1986)
 Hawks (1988)
 Brenda Starr (1989)
 Bed & Breakfast (1992)
 Killer Rules (1995)
 Pointman (1994)
 A Walton Wedding (1995)
 The Angel of Pennsylvania Avenue (1996)

Awards
 Nominee, Palme d'Or, The Buttercup Chain, 1970 Cannes Film Festival
 Nominee, Best Picture, The Heart Is a Lonely Hunter (Director for film's producer nominees, Thomas Ryan and Marc Merson), Golden Globes (1968)
 Nominee, Best Director in Television, Breaking Point,  Directors Guild of America (1963)
 Nominee, Best Director, Television Drama, Alcoa Premiere, Emmy Awards (1961)

References

External links

1927 births
2017 deaths
Film directors from New York City